Eli Nachamson Evans (July 28, 1936 – July 26, 2022) was a Jewish-American author from North Carolina whose work encompassed explorations of the Jewish experience in the Southern United States. He "left his biggest mark as the author of three books exploring the culture and history of Jews in the American South".

Early life and education

Evans was the son of Emanuel J. Evans, an American businessman and the first Jewish mayor of Durham, North Carolina, and Sara Nachamson, daughter of retailers Eli and Jenny Nachamson, who owned the United Dollar Stores Company.

He received a B.A. in English literature from the University of North Carolina in 1958, where he joined the Tau Epsilon Phi fraternity, and served as "the first Jewish president of the student body." He became an was in the United States Navy for two years and served in Japan. In the fall of 1958, he completed the Navy Supply Corps School as an ensign and was assigned to the USS Saint Paul (CA-73). After serving in the Navy, he received a J.D. from Yale Law School in 1963.

Career
After stints as a White House speechwriter for President Lyndon B. Johnson, and as an aide to North Carolina Governor Terry Sanford, Evans took a position with the Carnegie Corporation in New York City.

In 1971, he published The Provincials: A Personal History of the Jews of the South, which "set off a wave of interest in a culture that many people outside the region never knew existed". Evans became president of the Charles H. Revson Foundation in 1977, and published a biography of Judah P. Benjamin in 1989, followed by an anthology of personal stories in 1993. He was elected to the American Academy of Arts and Sciences in 2001.

Personal life
In 1981, Evans married Judith London of Montgomery, Alabama, whom he met in New York, and with whom he remained until her death in 2008. They had one son, Joshua.

Evans died at a Manhattan hospital from complications of COVID-19, two days before his 86th birthday.

Works
The Provincials: A Personal History of Jews in the South (New York: Antheneum, 1973) —Reprinted, 1997 and 2005.
Judah P. Benjamin: The Jewish Confederate (New York: The Free Press, 1988). .
The Lonely Days Were Sundays: Reflections of a Jewish Southerner (1993).
Overview: The War Between Jewish Brothers in America, in Jews and the Civil War: A Reader (eds. Jonathan D. Sarna & Adam Mendelsohn; NYU Press: 2010).

References

External links
 

1936 births
2022 deaths
20th-century American Jews
21st-century American Jews
20th-century American male writers
21st-century American male writers
Military personnel from North Carolina
Speechwriters for presidents of the United States
Jewish American writers
Fellows of the American Academy of Arts and Sciences
Deaths from the COVID-19 pandemic in New York (state)
University of North Carolina alumni
United States Navy officers
Writers from Durham, North Carolina
Yale Law School alumni